Wen Tiejun (born May 1951) is a Chinese agricultural economist who is a professor at the Renmin University of China.

Biography
Wen was born in Beijing, in May 1951, while his ancestral home in Changli County, Hebei. After graduating from the Journalism Department of the Renmin University of China in 1983, he was sent by the Chinese government to study in the Institute of Social Investigation of the University of Michigan and the World Bank, and then studied at Columbia University, Cornell University and the University of Southern California.

After returning to China, Wen studied in both the School of Economics and Management and the Graduate School of China Agricultural University. He successively worked in the Research Office of the General Political Department of the Central Military Commission, the Central Rural Policy Research Office, the Liaison Office of the Rural Development Research Center of the State Council, the Office of the National Rural Reform Experimental Zone, the Rural Economic Research Center of the Ministry of Agriculture, and the China Economic System Reform Research Association.

Publications

Co-authored publications

References

1951 births
Living people
Economists from Beijing
Agricultural economists
Renmin University of China alumni
Academic staff of Renmin University of China
China Agricultural University alumni